Ramchandra Srinivas Siras (1948 – 7 April 2010) was an Indian linguist and author. He was a professor at the Aligarh Muslim University specializing in Marathi literature and head of the Department of Modern Indian Languages. The film Aligarh, directed by Hansal Mehta, is based on his life.

Life 
After school in Nagpur, Siras studied psychology and linguistics at Nagpur University in India. In 1985 he got his doctorate in Marathi and a master's in psychology. He finished university studies and became a professor at Aligarh Muslim University (AMU) in 1988.

Siras suffered from fits at a young age and was advised against marriage. When considered cured of the condition later in life he was married. The marriage lasted for nearly 20 years but ended in divorce after a long separation.

He wrote several short stories in the Marathi language. In 2002, he received the literary award from Maharashtra Sahitya Parishad for "Paya Khalchi Hirawal" (Grass under my feet).

Suspension
On 8 February 2010, two men forced their way into Siras' house and caught him having consensual sex with another man.
On 9 February 2010, Siras was suspended by AMU for "gross misconduct" after having been ambushed by a local TV channel's camera crew, while having sex with a rickshaw puller. The AMU public relations officer, Rahat Abrar, stated: "Siras was captured on camera having sex with a rickshaw-puller. He was placed under suspension by the order of the vice-chancellor, professor P. K. Abdul Aziz".

He won his case against the university in Allahabad High Court on 1 April 2010, and got back his job as professor, along with his accommodation, until his retirement. The case was exacerbated by the involvement of students in the covert taping and ambush of Siras and his lover. The case was fought on the premise that Siras could not be penalised for being homosexual as Section 377 of the Indian Penal Code, which criminalized homosexuality, had been declared unconstitutional by the Delhi High Court in 2009.

Death
On 7 April 2010, Siras died in his apartment in Aligarh. Police suspected suicide, and preliminary results from the autopsy showed traces of poison in his body. A case of murder was later registered and six people arrested. 
On 19 April, the Superintendent of Police stated that three journalists and four AMU officials were named as part of the crime. The case was closed without resolution after the police failed to find sufficient evidence.

Siras was due to retire officially from academia six months later, and the letter officially revoking his suspension arrived at his office the day after his death.

Works 

 Several short stories in the Marathi language.
 Award-winning book of Marathi poems, Grass Under My Feet (2002)

Awards 
 2002: literary award by Maharashtra Sahitya Parishad.

In popular culture
Manoj Bajpayee portrayed him in his biopic titled Aligarh. The film received warm reviews from the critics and Bajpayee went on to win several accolades for his performance.

See also
 Suicide of Tyler Clementi, a closeted student at Rutgers University, after being unknowingly filmed having sex with a male student
 Philadelphia, a film about a gay man being terminated from his law firm and his fight for compensation

References

External links 
 

20th-century Indian linguists
Marathi-language writers
Indian gay writers
Indian LGBT rights activists
Rashtrasant Tukadoji Maharaj Nagpur University alumni
Academic staff of Aligarh Muslim University
1948 births
2010 deaths
Scholars from Maharashtra
Indian LGBT scientists
20th-century Indian short story writers
Writers from Maharashtra
20th-century Indian male writers
Gay academics
Gay scientists
Deaths by poisoning